Scat Records is a St. Louis, Missouri-based independent record label. It was founded in Cleveland, Ohio, in 1989, and many of the bands released on the label are from Ohio. The label is notable for featuring Guided by Voices, The Mice and Cobra Verde on its roster. Scat Records' owner Robert Griffin himself played in the band Spike in Vain. Griffin discovered Guided by Voices from Matt Sweeney, and their 1994 release Bee Thousand helped launch the band before they signed with Matador Records. Scat also released a compilation of Cleveland pre-punk.

See also
 Scat Records artists
 List of record labels

References

External links
 
 Old (Official) Website
 Scat Records catalog on Discogs

Record labels established in 1989
American independent record labels
Indie rock record labels
1989 establishments in Missouri